Bougainville is a commune in the Somme department in Hauts-de-France in northern France.

Geography

Population

Places of interest
 Church of Saint-Arnould (18th century)
 Traces of a Gallo-Roman villa.

See also
Communes of the Somme department

References

External links

 Photo
Memorial of the Somme

Communes of Somme (department)